Happy Husbands is a 2010 Indian Malayalam-language comedy film directed by Saji Surendran and written by Krishna Poojappura. It is the remake of 2002 Tamil film Charlie Chaplin. The film stars Jayaram, Jayasurya and Indrajith Sukumaran in title roles with Samvrutha Sunil, Bhavana, Rima Kallingal, Vandana Menon, and Suraj Venjaramoodu in supporting roles. The film completed a 150-day theatrical run.

Plot summary
Mukundan Menon (Jayaram) runs a newspaper called Kerala Today. He is a normal husband who loves his wife Krishnendu (Bhavana) a lot, but she is too possessive about him. She thinks he is not very expressive about his feelings, and is always worried that he might one day fall for some other beautiful girl.

John Mathai (Jayasurya) is a photographer in Mukundan's publication. He was neither interested in girls nor keen to get married until he met Sereena (Vandana).

Rahul (Indrajith) is just the opposite. He is extremely romantic and never comes home without some cute gifts for his wife, Shreya (Samvrutha Sunil). But she doesn't know that, behind her back, her darling husband is dying to flirt with every woman that he sees.

It is into the lives of these three couples that a bar singer, Diana (Rima Kallingal), arrives and things take some interesting turns. Diana is seeking to take revenge on Mukundan Menon since it was on his article in Kerala Today that the Maharashtra court took as a petition and then banned the bar girls in Maharashtra, thus ruining Diana's profession.

Diana forcibly comes to Mukundan Menon's house one day with her evil intentions and that catches the eye of Krishnendu. To escape from trouble, Mukundan Menon says that she is John's wife. Later, when John, Mukundan and Rahul are talking about John's marriage proposal to Serena's father, Diana comes there by accident. Rahul says that she is Mukundan's wife and she is mentally imbalanced. So now Krishnendu and Shreya think Diana is John's wife, and John's real wife Serneena believes that Diana is Mukundan's wife. At one time, all these people come together at Malaysia for a vacation. This leads to a lot of confusion among the wives and others and finally the wives realise the truth and thus leave their husbands. The husbands try many attempts to win their wives back but all their attempts go in vain. Finally Diana makes them understand their husbands' love for them and that it was the fear of losing their wives that made them lie. The wives forgive their husbands.

Cast
 Jayaram as Mukundan Menon
 Indrajith Sukumaran as Rahul Vallyathan
 Jayasurya as John Mathai
 Bhavana as Krishnendu Mukundan Menon
 Samvrutha Sunil as Shreya Rahul
 Vandana Menon as Sereena John Mathai
 Rima Kallingal as Diana Philip
 Suraj Venjaramood as Rajappan a.k.a. Theepandam Raj Boss 
 Salim Kumar as Satyapalan & Dharmapalan (Double Role)
 Maniyanpilla Raju as Pazhakutti Pavithran/ (Pazham Pavan)
 Mamukkoya as Pakshisatrakkaran
 T. P. Madhavan as Ret. DGP. John Mathai
 Shaju as Pazhakutty's assistant
 Subi Suresh as Servant

Music
The soundtrack for this film was composed by M. Jayachandran.
 "Etho Poonilakalam" - Rashmi Vijayan
 "Happy Husbands" - Indrajith, Anand Narayan, Achu Rajamani
 "Take It Easy" - Achu Rajamani

Reception
Upon release, the film became a commercial success. It collected more than 2.5 crore distributor's share from Kerala in 75 days run. The film completed a 150-day run in a theatre in Thiruvananthapuram.

References

External links
 
 

2010 films
2010s Malayalam-language films
Malayalam remakes of Tamil films
Films shot in Kochi
Films shot in Malaysia
Films scored by M. Jayachandran
Films directed by Saji Surendran